Amphibalanus improvisus, the bay barnacle, European acorn barnacle, is a species of acorn barnacle in the family Balanidae.

Description
Amphibalanus improvisus has a smooth white or pale grey conical calcareous shell composed of six fused plates. There is an oval or rhombic opening at the top which is blocked by two hinged plates. The base is characteristically grooved radially. This species can be confused with the striped barnacle (Amphibalanus amphitrite)  and in European waters with the northern rock barnacle (Semibalanus balanoides) or the rock barnacle (Balanus crenatus).

Distribution

Amphibalanus improvisus has a cosmopolitan distribution and is found in temperate and tropical parts of the Atlantic Ocean, the Arctic Ocean, the Baltic Sea the North Sea, the Mediterranean Sea and the Black Sea. It is not known where the species natural range lies but it may have originated in North America. It has colonised many parts of the world's oceans including the Indo-Pacific and Australasia as a biofouling agent on the hulls of ships. It was one of the first recorded introductions to the Baltic Sea, having been found in Sweden and Lithuania in 1844, the Elbe estuary in 1854 and Great Britain in the 1880s.

Habitat
It has been known to block the water intake pipes of factories and power stations. It is tolerant of both high and low salinity levels and is often found in estuaries and low salinity bays. As an invasive species it competes with native organisms and it is an unwanted coloniser of the shells of cultivated oysters and mussels and aquaculture cages.

Biology

Amphibalanus improvisus is a filter feeder. It extends its six pairs of modified legs called cirri to catch plankton and other organic material floating past. It is a hermaphrodite and sperm is passed into the cavity of a neighbouring barnacle through a long penis. The eggs are fertilised and brooded in the cavity and hatch into nauplius larvae which drift with the currents. After six naupliar stages occupying two to five weeks, these become cyprid larvae and find a suitable surface on which to settle. Here they cement themselves to the substrate and undergo metamorphosis into juveniles. There may be several broods in the year but  usually just two in the cooler waters of the Baltic and only one in low salinity environments.

References

External links
Balanus improvisus, European Network on Invasive Species

Barnacles
Crustaceans described in 1854
Taxa named by Charles Darwin